Oxysterol binding protein-like 9 is a protein that in humans is encoded by the OSBPL9 gene.

This gene encodes a member of the oxysterol-binding protein (OSBP) family, a group of intracellular lipid receptors. Most members contain an N-terminal pleckstrin homology domain and a highly conserved C-terminal OSBP-like sterol-binding domain, although some members contain only the sterol-binding domain. This family member functions as a cholesterol transfer protein that regulates Golgi structure and function. Multiple transcript variants, most of which encode distinct isoforms, have been identified. Related pseudogenes have been identified on chromosomes 3, 11 and 12.

Model organisms				

Model organisms have been used in the study of OSBPL9 function. A conditional knockout mouse line, called Osbpl9tm1a(KOMP)Wtsi was generated as part of the International Knockout Mouse Consortium program — a high-throughput mutagenesis project to generate and distribute animal models of disease to interested scientists — at the Wellcome Trust Sanger Institute.

Male and female animals underwent a standardized phenotypic screen to determine the effects of deletion. Twenty four tests were carried out on homozygous mutant adult mice, however no significant abnormalities were observed.

References

Further reading 
 
 
 
 
 
 
 
 
 
 
 
 
 
 

Genes mutated in mice